The men's 1500 metres event was part of the track and field athletics programme at the 1920 Summer Olympics. The competition was held on Wednesday, August 18, 1920, and on Thursday, August 19, 1920. Twenty-nine runners from 12 nations competed. No nation had more than 4 runners, suggesting the limit had been reduced from the 12 maximum in force in 1908 and 1912. The event was won by Albert Hill of Great Britain, completing his middle-distance double (gold in the 800 metres and 1500 metres). It was the nation's second consecutive and third overall championship in the men's 1500 metres.

Background

This was the sixth appearance of the event, which is one of 12 athletics events to have been held at every Summer Olympics. Two finalists from the pre-war 1912 Games returned: sixth-place finisher Philip Noel-Baker of Great Britain and seventh-place finisher John Zander of Sweden. Zander was the world record holder.

Czechoslovakia, Estonia, Japan, and Spain each made their first appearance in the event. The United States made its sixth appearance, the only nation to have competed in the men's 1500 metres at each Games to that point.

Competition format

The competition consisted of two rounds, the format used since 1908. With a smaller field, the focus shifted to fewer semifinals with more qualifiers from each. Only four semifinals were held, with anywhere between 5 and 8 runners in each. The top three runners in each heat advanced to the final, for a 12-man final race (increased to 13 when one semifinalist was advanced after being obstructed).

Records

These were the standing world and Olympic records prior to the 1920 Summer Olympics.

No world or Olympic records were set during the competition.

Schedule

Results
Times were generally only published for the winners of each heat. Some of the times listed below are estimates based on contemporary reports of the races.

Round 1

Heat 1

Heat 2

Heat 3

Heat 4

René Leray was advanced to the final after being interfered with by Villemson on the final lap.

Final

References

Further reading
 
 

1500 metres
1500 metres at the Olympics